Morisetti is an Italian surname. Notable people with the surname include:

Guglielmo Morisetti (1886–?), Italian cyclist
Neil Morisetti, British Royal Navy admiral

Italian-language surnames